Chinocup is a small town in the Great Southern region of Western Australia. It is situated between the towns of Nyabing and Pingrup.

It was originally a station on the now abandoned Nyabing to Pingrup railway. Land was soon in demand in the area around the station, and blocks were surveyed and released in 1923. The townsite was gazetted as Chinokup later the same year; the spelling was changed to its present form in 1962.

The name is named after the nearby Lake Chinocup, which had been recorded when the area was explored in 1879. The name is Aboriginal in origin but its meaning is unknown.

A freak storm hit the area in January 1951, stripping leaves from trees and any hay left standing. Large hailstones caused some damage to properties and heavy rain filled dams and washed out fences. 250 points of rain were recorded in a few hours in some areas.

Stock yards were erected alongside the railway station in 1929 to assist farmers in moving stock by rail and to encourage further production of sheep and other stock in the area.

Notes

References 

Great Southern (Western Australia)